Karasht Rural District is in the Central District of Pardis County, Tehran province, Iran. At the National Censuses of 2006 and 2011, its constituent parts were in the Central District of Tehran County. The cities of Bumahen and Pardis, and most of Siyahrud Rural District separated from Tehran County on 29 December 2012 to establish Pardis County.

At the most recent census of 2016, the population of the rural district was 5,237 in 1,650 households. The largest of its 11 villages was Bagh-e Komesh, with 2,566 people. After the census, the Central District was established, with two rural districts (Bagh-e Komesh and Karasht) and the city of Pardis as its capital.

References 

Pardis County

Rural Districts of Tehran Province

Populated places in Tehran Province

Populated places in Pardis County